Oshurkovo is a rural locality (a selo) in Ivolginsky District, Republic of Buryatia, Russia. The population was 427 as of 2010. There are 15 streets.

Geography 
Oshurkovo is located 38 km northeast of Ivolginsk (the district's administrative centre) by road. Mostovoy is the nearest rural locality.

References 

Rural localities in Ivolginsky District